John Peter Carroll (28 May 1924 – 17 October 2001) was an Irish footballer who played as a centre-forward for Limerick, West Ham United and Corby Town.

Footballing career
Carroll played for Limerick before signing for West Ham in 1948 along with his fellow countrymen, Danny McGowan and Fred Kearns. He made his debut against Sheffield Wednesday on 30 August 1948. Carroll played only five times in his West Ham career in all competitions without scoring. In 1949 he moved to Corby Town.

Personal life and death
Carroll was born in Limerick, Ireland on 28 May 1924. He died in Limerick on 17 October 2001, at the age of 77.

References

1924 births
2001 deaths
Republic of Ireland association footballers
Association football forwards
Limerick F.C. players
West Ham United F.C. players
Corby Town F.C. players
English Football League players
Sportspeople from Limerick (city)
Association footballers from County Limerick